Albert Thys (1894 – 1976) was a Belgian painter.

He was born on 18 March 1894 in Kontich, Antwerp, Belgium. He studied at the Academy of Fine Arts in Antwerp, where he was a student of Isidore Opsomer. He painted portraits and landscapes.

References

External links

1894 births
1976 deaths
19th-century Belgian painters
19th-century Belgian male artists
Artists from Antwerp
People from Kontich